Mesokomo is a village of the Lagkadas municipality. The 2011 census recorded 62 inhabitants in the village. Mesokomo is a part of the community of Nea Kallindoia.

See also
List of settlements in the Thessaloniki regional unit

References

Populated places in Thessaloniki (regional unit)